Infinite is the eighth studio album by power metal band Stratovarius, released on 28 February 2000 through Nuclear Blast (Europe) and Victor Entertainment (Japan). The album reached No. 1 on the Finnish albums chart and remained on that chart for nine weeks, as well as reaching the top 100 in six other countries. "Hunting High and Low" and "A Million Light Years Away" were released as singles, reaching No. 4 and 14 respectively on the Finnish singles chart. Infinite was certified Platinum in June 2013, with 21,907 copies sold.

Four bonus tracks were made available for different international editions: "Why Are We Here?", "It's a Mystery", "What Can I Say" and "Keep the Flame", all of which were later released on the band's 2001 compilation album Intermission.

Track listing

Personnel
Stratovarius
Timo Kotipelto – vocals
Timo Tolkki – guitar
Jari Kainulainen – bass
Jens Johansson – keyboard
Jörg Michael – drums

Technical
Timo Tolkki – engineering, producer
Mikko Karmila – engineering, mixing
Mika Jussila – mastering

Chart performance

Singles

Certifications

See also
List of number-one albums (Finland)

References

External links
Infinite at stratovarius.com

Stratovarius albums
2000 albums
Nuclear Blast albums